The Council of Ministers of West Bengal is the collective decision-making body of the Government of West Bengal, composed of the Chief Minister and bagunnava ra , the most senior of the government ministers. The Cabinet is the ultimate decision-making body of the executive within the Westminster system of government in traditional constitutional theory.

The Union Council of Ministers of the Government of West Bengal was formed after the 2011 West Bengal state assembly election held in six phases in 2011: on 18 April, 23 April, 27 April, 3 May, 7 and 10 May 2011. The results of the election were announced on 13 May 2011 and led to the formation of the 15th Vidhan Sabha. Mamata Banerjee took oath as the 11th Chief Minister of West Bengal on 20 May 2011, followed by the oath-taking ceremonies of the present 'Council of Ministers'.

Constitutional requirement

For the Council of Ministers to aid and advise Governor 
According to Article 163 of the Indian Constitution,

This means that the Ministers serve under the pleasure of the Governor and he/she may remove them, on the advice of the Chief Minister, whenever they want.

For other provisions as to Ministers 
According to Article 164 of the Indian Constitution,

Government and politics
The West Bengal is governed through a parliamentary system of representative democracy, a feature the state shares with other Indian states. Universal suffrage is granted to residents. There are two branches of government. The legislature, the West Bengal Legislative Assembly, consists of elected members and special office bearers such as the Speaker and Deputy Speaker, that are elected by the members. Assembly meetings are presided over by the Speaker or the Deputy Speaker in the Speaker's absence. The judiciary is composed of the Calcutta High Court and a system of lower courts. Executive authority is vested in the Council of Ministers headed by the Chief Minister, although the titular head of government is the Governor. The Governor is the head of state appointed by the President of India. The leader of the party or coalition with a majority in the Legislative Assembly is appointed as the Chief Minister by the Governor, and the Council of Ministers are appointed by the Governor on the advice of the Chief Minister. The Council of Ministers reports to the Legislative Assembly. The Assembly is unicameral with 295 Members of the Legislative Assembly, or MLAs, including one nominated from the Anglo-Indian community. Terms of office run for 5 years, unless the Assembly is dissolved prior to the completion of the term. Auxiliary authorities known as panchayats, for which local body elections are regularly held, govern local affairs. The state contributes 42 seats to Lok Sabha and 16 seats to Rajya Sabha of the Indian Parliament.

The main players in the regional politics are the All India Trinamool Congress, the Indian National Congress, the Left Front alliance. Following the West Bengal State Assembly Election in 2011, the All India Trinamool Congress and Indian National Congress coalition under Mamata Banerjee of the All India Trinamool Congress was elected to power (getting 225 seats in the legislature). West Bengal had been ruled by the Left Front for the past 34 years, making it the world's longest-running democratically elected communist government.

Council of Ministers 

There are Total 41 Ministers with excluding Chief Minister of West Bengal with 17 New Face. This is a list of members of the Council of Ministers of the Government of West Bengal after the 2016 state assembly election. All ministers are based in offices of their respective Ministries in Kolkata. All Cabinet members are mandated by the constitution to be members of the Vidhan Sabha of West Bengal. In a departure from the norm the Chief Minister, Mamata Banerjee, did not join the cabinet as a member of the Vidhan Sabha.

Ranking
There are three categories of ministers, in descending order of rank:
 Cabinet Minister: Senior minister in-charge of a ministry. A cabinet minister may also hold additional charges of other Ministries, where no other Cabinet minister is appointed
 Minister of State (Independent Charges): Junior minister not reporting to a cabinet minister
 Minister of State (MoS): Junior minister with overseeing Cabinet Minister, usually tasked with a specific responsibility in that ministry. For instance, an MoS in the Finance Ministry may only handle taxation

Cabinet Ministers

Ministers of State (Independent Charges)

Ministers of State (MoS)

Notes

References

West Bengal ministries

Trinamool Congress
Mamata Banerjee
Cabinets established in 2011
Cabinets disestablished in 2016
2011 establishments in West Bengal
2016 disestablishments in India
1